Amshipora or Amshi Pora (locally known as Amashpur) is a village situated in Shopian district of Jammu and Kashmir, India.

Geography 
The village is connected to Shopian by a metalled road. The village is bounded by Saidpora Bala and Saidpora Payeen in the north, Vehil-Shamsipora in the east, Ramnagri (Jumnagar) in the south and Sedow in the west.

Economy 
The main occupation of its denizens is cultivation of fruits, especially apples.

Resistance 
Amshi Pora, along with its neighbour Jamnagri, is a hotbed of Post-Burhan resistance against India. Militants from Amshipora include Waseem Wagay , Aetimaad Malik ,Shahijahan,junaid ayoub ,shariq ayoub,sameer sofi,saqibsofi, sameer sofi was declared as hybrid miltant after killed in an operation

2020 murders 
On 18 July 2020, three Kashmiri laborers from Pir Panjal Kashmir, one a minor, were murdered by Indian military personnel of the Rashtriya Rifles in the village. According to a police report, the encounter was staged by Cap. Bhopendra Singh of 62 RR for the purpose of a cash reward and promotion.and In year 2022 another civilian (shakeel ahmad khan)was killed in an operation along with a huge property loss he was the father of 3 children

Demographics 
According to 2011 Census of India, Amshipora hosts 268 households, with a population of 1,712. Islam is the religion of its entire population.

References 

Villages in Shopian district